The 61st Ohio Infantry Regiment was an infantry regiment in the Union Army during the American Civil War.

Service
The 61st Ohio Infantry Regiment was organized at Camp Chase in Columbus, Ohio and mustered in for three years service on April 23, 1862, under the command of Colonel Newton Schleich.

The regiment was attached to 1st Brigade, 3rd Division, I Corps, Army of Virginia, June to September 1862. 1st Brigade, 3rd Division, XI Corps, Army of the Potomac, to October 1862. 2nd Brigade, 2nd Division, XI Corps, to November 1862. 1st Brigade, 3rd Division, XI Corps, Army of the Potomac, to October 1863. Army of the Cumberland to April 1864. 3rd Brigade, 1st Division, XX Corps, Army of the Cumberland, to March 1865.

The 61st Ohio Infantry ceased to exist on March 31, 1865, when it was consolidated with the 82nd Ohio Infantry.

Detailed service
Ordered to western Virginia May 27, and joined Fremont's army at Strasburg, Va., June 23, 1862. March to Sperryville and duty there until August 8, 1862. Pope's Campaign in northern Virginia August 16-September 2. Freeman's Ford August 22. Sulphur Springs August 23–24. Battles of Groveton August 29, and Bull Run August 30. Duty in the defenses of Washington, D.C., until December. March to Fredericksburg, Va., December 10–15. "Mud March" January 20–24, 1863. Duty at Stafford Court House until April 27. Chancellorsville Campaign April 27-May 6. Battle of Chancellorsville May 1–5. Gettysburg Campaign June 11-July 24. Battle of Gettysburg, July 1–3. Pursuit of Lee to Manassas Gap, Va., July 5–24. Duty along Orange & Alexandria Railroad July 26 to September 26. Movement to Bridgeport, Ala., September 26-October 3. Reopening Tennessee River October 26–29. Battle of Wauhatchie, Tenn., October 28–29. Chattanooga-Ringgold Campaign November 23–27. Orchard Knob November 23. Mission Lodge November 24–25. March to relief of Knoxville, Tenn., November 28-December 8. Moved to Bridgeport, Ala., and duty there until March 1864. Veterans on furlough March and April. Atlanta Campaign May 1-September 8. Demonstration on Rocky Faced Ridge May 8–11. Battle of Resaca May 14–15. Cassville May 19. New Hope Church May 25. Battles about Dallas, New Hope Church, and Allatoona Hills, May 25-June 5. Lost Mountain June 8. Operations about Marietta and against Kennesaw Mountain June 10-July 2. Pine Hill June 11–14. Lost Mountain June 15–17. Gilgal, or Golgotha Church, June 15. Muddy Creek June 17. Noyes' Creek June 19. Kolb's Farm June 22. Assault on Kennesaw June 27. Ruff's Station July 4. Chattahoochie River June 5–17. Peachtree Creek July 19–20. Siege of Atlanta July 22-August 25. Operations at Chattahoochie River Bridge May 26-September 2. Occupation of Atlanta September 2-November 15. Expedition from Atlanta to Tuckum's Cross Roads October 26–29. March to the sea November 15-December 10. Montieth Swamp December 9. Siege of Savannah December 10–21. Campaign of the Carolinas January to March 1865. Taylor's Hole Creek, Averysboro, N.C., March 16. Battle of Bentonville March 19–21. Occupation of Goldsboro March 24.

Casualties
The regiment lost a total of 165 men during service; 7 officers and 68 enlisted men killed or mortally wounded, 90 enlisted men died of disease.

Commanders
 Colonel Newton Schleich
 Colonel Stephen J. McGroarty - commanded at the second battle of Bull Run as lieutenant colonel

See also
 82nd Ohio Infantry
 List of Ohio Civil War units
 Ohio in the Civil War
 Second Battle of Bull Run
 Battle of Chancellorsville
 Gettysburg Campaign
 Battle of Wauhatchie
 Atlanta Campaign
 Sherman's March to the Sea
 Carolinas Campaign

Notes

References

External links
 Ohio in the Civil War: 61st Ohio Volunteer Infantry by Larry Stevens
 National flag of the 61st Ohio Infantry
 National flag of the 61st Ohio Infantry
 National flag of the 61st Ohio Infantry
 Regimental flag of the 61st Ohio Infantry

Military units and formations established in 1862
Military units and formations disestablished in 1865
Units and formations of the Union Army from Ohio
1862 establishments in Ohio